Adeniji is both a surname and a given name. Notable people with the name include:

Surname
Anthonia Adenike Adeniji (born 1971), Nigerian academic
Hakeem Adeniji (born 1997), American football player
Olawale Adeniji Ige (born 1938), Nigerian engineer
Oluyemi Adeniji (1934–2017), Nigerian diplomat and politician
Tunde Adeniji (born 1995), Nigerian footballer

Given name 
 Adeniji Adele (1893–1964), Nigerian Oba of Lagos